State Highway 4A (West Bengal) is a state highway in West Bengal, India.

Route
SH 4A originates from Tulin and passes through Jhalda and Kotshila and terminates at Chas More.

The total length of SH 4A is 39 km.

The only district traversed by SH 4A is:
Purulia district (0 - 39 km)

See also
List of state highways in West Bengal
 North-South Corridor

References

State Highways in West Bengal